The 2017–18 Bowling Green Falcons men's basketball team represents Bowling Green State University during the 2017–18 NCAA Division I men's basketball season. The Falcons, led by third-year head coach Michael Huger, play their home games at the Stroh Center as members of the East Division of the Mid-American Conference.

Previous season
The Falcons finished the 2016–17 season 13–19, 7–11 in MAC play to finish in a tie for eighth place. As the No. 10 seed in the MAC tournament, they lost in the first round to Toledo.

Offseason

Recruiting class of 2017

Schedule and results

|-
!colspan=9 style=|Exhibition

|-
!colspan=9 style=|Non-conference regular season

|-
!colspan=9 style=| MAC regular season

|-
!colspan=9 style=| MAC tournament

See also
2017–18 Bowling Green Falcons women's basketball team

References

Bowling Green
Bowling Green Falcons men's basketball seasons